Vinay Galetiya (born 10 December 1992) is an Indian cricketer. He made his Twenty20 debut for Himachal Pradesh in the 2014–15 Syed Mushtaq Ali Trophy on 5 April 2015. He made his List A debut for Himachal Pradesh in the 2017–18 Vijay Hazare Trophy on 5 February 2018. He made his first-class debut on 3 March 2022, for Himachal Pradesh in the 2021–22 Ranji Trophy.

References

External links
 

1992 births
Living people
Indian cricketers
Himachal Pradesh cricketers
Place of birth missing (living people)